Reginald Louis "Reggie" Camp (born February 28, 1961 in San Francisco, California) is a former American football defensive end in the National Football League. He was drafted by the Cleveland Browns in the third round of the 1983 NFL Draft. He played college football at California.

During his playing career as a pro, Camp was listed at 6-feet, 4-inches (1.93 m) and weighing 274 lbs (124 kg). He also played one season for the Atlanta Falcons in 1988.  He had 35 sacks and 2 fumble recoveries in a six-year career.
He is now the head coach of Bear Creek High School in Stockton, California.

References

1961 births
Living people
Players of American football from San Francisco
American football defensive ends
California Golden Bears football players
Cleveland Browns players
Atlanta Falcons players